The Gov. James T. Lewis House is located in Columbus, Wisconsin, United States. It was added to the National Register of Historic Places in 1982.

History
The house was home to James T. Lewis, the ninth Governor of Wisconsin. It has been valued at $499,900.

References

Houses in Columbia County, Wisconsin
Houses on the National Register of Historic Places in Wisconsin
Italianate architecture in Wisconsin
Columbus, Wisconsin
National Register of Historic Places in Columbia County, Wisconsin